The Monkey Wrench Gang is a novel written by American author Edward Abbey (1927–1989), published in 1975.

Abbey's most famous work of fiction, the novel concerns the use of sabotage to protest environmentally damaging activities in the Southwestern United States, and was so influential that the term "monkeywrench" has come to mean, besides sabotage and damage to machines, any sabotage, activism, law-making, or law-breaking to preserve wilderness, wild spaces and ecosystems.

In 1985, Dream Garden Press released a special 10th Anniversary edition of the book featuring illustrations by R. Crumb, plus a chapter titled "Seldom Seen at Home" that had been deleted from the original edition. Crumb's illustrations were used for a limited-edition calendar based on the book. The most recent edition was released in 2006 by Harper Perennial Modern Classics.

Plot summary
The book's four main characters are ecologically minded misfits—"Seldom Seen" Smith, a Jack Mormon river guide; Doc Sarvis, an odd but wealthy and wise surgeon; Bonnie Abbzug, his young Jewish feminist assistant; and a rather eccentric Green Beret Vietnam veteran, George Hayduke. Together, although not always working as a tightly knit team, they form the titular group dedicated to the destruction of what they see as the system that pollutes and destroys their environment, the American West. As the gang's attacks on deserted bulldozers and trains continue, the law closes in.

For the gang, the enemy is those who would develop the American Southwest—despoiling the land, befouling the air, and destroying nature and the sacred purity of Abbey's desert world. Their greatest hatred is focused on the Glen Canyon Dam, a monolithic edifice of concrete that the monkey-wrenchers seek to destroy because it dams a beautiful wild river.

Reception
 From the National Observer, "A sad, hilarious, exuberant, vulgar fairy tale... It'll make you want to go out and blow up a dam."
 From The New York Times, "Since the publication of his novel The Monkey Wrench Gang last September, Mr. Abbey, a 48-year-old native of a rural town in Pennsylvania, has become an underground cult hero throughout the West among students, environmentalists and would‐be 'eco‐raiders.'"
 From The Washington Post, "One of the best writers to deal with the American West."
 From the Houston Chronicle, "What a thing of beauty is Edward Abbey's The Monkey Wrench Gang."

Legacy

In his book Screw Unto Others, George Hayduke states that Edward Abbey was his mentor, and mentions The Monkey Wrench Gang as the origin of the term monkey-wrenching. Hayduke says The Monkey Wrench Gang inspired environmentalist David Foreman to help create Earth First! a direct action environmental organization that often advocates much of the minor vandalism depicted in the book. Many scenes of vandalism and ecologically motivated mayhem, including a billboard burning at the beginning of the book and the use of caltrops to elude a group of vigilantes, are presented in sufficient detail as to form a skeletal how-to for would-be saboteurs. The actions are presented in a larger-than-life format, because much of what Hayduke, and the rest of the characters in the story face are larger-than-life obstacles that require larger-than-life approaches.

The symbol of Earth First! is a monkey wrench and stone hammer.

In his book Sewer, Gas & Electric: The Public Works Trilogy, author Matt Ruff notes:
"One of my other literary inspirations for the [...] subplot was Edward Abbey’s The Monkey Wrench Gang. That book’s protagonist, George Hayduke, is a Vietnam vet and former POW who launches a campaign of sabotage against the polluters who are ruining his beloved southwestern desert. Hayduke is a pretty angry guy, but he also loves life, and in his own fatalistic way he remains an optimist (my favorite line in the novel, uttered at a moment when Hayduke’s luck appears to have run out, is 'When the situation is hopeless, there’s nothing to worry about'."

Sequel 
 Hayduke Lives! continues the story from where The Monkey Wrench Gang left off.

Adaptations

A film adaptation of the book, written and directed by Henry Joost and Ariel Schulman, has long been in pre-production. Neil Young is set to score the film, and Open Road Films is its distributor in the United States. The film rights holders for the book filed suit against the producers of Night Moves, charging that the film's plot is significantly similar to that of the book.

See also
 Adbusters
 Culture jamming
 Environmentalism

References

Further reading
 Cassuto, David N. "Waging Water: Hydrology vs. Mythology in The Monkey Wrench Gang." ISLE: Interdisciplinary Studies in Literature and the Environment 2.1 (1994): 13–36.
 Slovic, Scott. "Aestheticism and Awareness: The Psychology of Edward Abbey's The Monkey Wrench Gang." CEA Critic 55.3 (1993): 54–68.
 Box, C.J.,  Savage Run, G.P. Putnam's Sons, publishers, 2002;

External links
 
 The environmentalist as macho, working class, cowboy: Edward Abbey's The Monkey Wrench Gang
 "Rereading: Robert Macfarlane on The Monkey Wrench Gang
 "As reviewed by Darren Botello-Samson, Department of Social Sciences, Pittsburg State University

Novels by Edward Abbey
1975 American novels
Anarchist fiction
Eco-terrorism in fiction
Environmental fiction books
Mormonism in fiction
Green anarchism
1975 in the environment
Radical environmentalism